Silver is a chemical element with symbol Ag and atomic number 47.

Silver may also refer to:

Other common meanings
 Silver (color)
 Silver (household), dishware, cutlery and other items made of silver
 Silver medal, an award given to the runner-up of contests

Arts and entertainment
 Silver (TV channel)
 Silver (video game), a 1999 game for the PC and Dreamcast
 Silver (90210), a fictional character on the television series 90210
 Silver (film), a 1999 Japanese film
 Pokémon Silver,  a game for the Game Boy
 Long John Silver, main antagonist of Robert Louis Stevenson's novel Treasure Island
 Silver (Andrew Motion novel), a sequel to Treasure Island
 Silver the Hedgehog, a psychic character in the Sonic the Hedgehog series
 Judge Silver, in the Judge Dredd comic strip
 Silver, the Lone Ranger's horse
 Pirates of the Caribbean: Jack Sparrow: Silver, a prequel novel in the Pirates of the Caribbean franchise
Silver, a grey bird from the game Angry Birds 2

Music
 Silver (band), an American 1970s country-rock band
 Silver (concert), a 2012 music concert by Filipina singer Regine Velasquez
 Silver (Boiled in Lead album), 2008
 Silver (Johnny Cash album), 1979
 Silver (Cheap Trick album)
 Silver (Cliff Richard album), 1983
 Silver (Moist album), 1994
 Silver (Starflyer 59 album), 1994
 Silver (The Wrens album), 1994
 Silver, an album by 7th Heaven
 Silver, an album by Fourplay, 2015
 Silver (Jesu EP), 2006
 Silver, an EP by Minuit, 1999
 "Silver" (Echo & the Bunnymen song)
 "Silver" (DMA's song)
 "Silver", a song by the Pixies on the album Doolittle (1989)

People
 Silver (given name)
 Silver (surname)

Places
 Silver, Manitoba, Canada, an unincorporated community
 Silver Islet, Ontario, Canada
 Silver Township, Cherokee County, Iowa, United States
 Silver Township, Carlton County, Minnesota, United States
 Silver, Texas, United States, an unincorporated community
 Silver City (disambiguation)
 Silver Creek (disambiguation)
 Silver Lake (disambiguation)

Structures
 Silver Bridge, over the Ohio River
 Silver Center of Arts and Sciences, New York University
 Silver Stadium, a former baseball stadium in Rochester, New York

Transportation
 Silver Airways, a United States-based regional airline
 Silver Line (MBTA), a Massachusetts public transport route
 Silver Line (Washington Metro), a planned public transport route
 Back Bone Silver, a French paramotor design

Other uses
 Silver Party, an 1892–1911 U.S. political party
 Silver Pictures, a film production company founded by Joel Silver
 Operation Silver (1949), wire-tapping of the Soviet Army headquarters in Vienna
 Operation Silver (2007), a British-led operation against Taliban forces in Afghanistan

See also

 Ag (disambiguation)
 
 
 Sliver (disambiguation)
 Silvers (disambiguation)
 Silva (disambiguation)
 Sylva (disambiguation)